The Big Steal is a 1990 Australian teen comedy film set in Melbourne, Australia directed by Nadia Tass starring Ben Mendelsohn, Claudia Karvan and Steve Bisley. David Parker was the scriptwriter and cinematographer. The film went on to win three Australian Film Institute awards.

Plot
Ben Mendelsohn plays 18 year-old Danny Clark in Footscray, Melbourne, a young man who is looking to increase his cool factor in order to secure the affections of Joanna, played by Claudia Karvan.

Danny offers to take Joanna out for a ride in a Jaguar as a way to impress her, but his actual vehicle is a 1963 Nissan Cedric which Danny knows is not 'cool'. In need of a Jaguar in a hurry, Danny decides to trade the Nissan Cedric for a more impressive vehicle.

Gordon Farkas, a crooked used car salesman played by Steve Bisley, tricks Danny into buying a 1973 Jaguar XJ6. The Jaguar engine, true to form, blows up. After a confrontation which culminates with Joanna leaving Danny, an investigation of the engine reveals it's been swapped by Gordon Farkas. Danny sets about seeking justice and winning back Joanna's affections.

Daniel and friends trick Gordon while his car is parked in a multi storey car park, and put the blown up engine in Gordon's Jaguar. Gordon, drunk, drives off without realising. He is arrested for going through a red light and for being drunk. Danny now has a perfect 4.2 l Jaguar to impress Joanna, which he does briefly when her parents are away for the weekend, until they return and surprise them and Danny flees. 

Everything unravels when Gordon mistakenly believes that Joanna's father has stolen his Jaguar engine and steals that car in error, defacing it, later getting his comeuppance. Various car chases result in Gordon failing to catch Danny, and a postscript shows Gordon serving 5 years in Pentridge prison for 37 Motor Traders Act offences, Danny and Joanna getting married later that year, and his friends in their ideal jobs in computing and car sales.

Cast
 Ben Mendelsohn as Danny Clark
 Claudia Karvan as Joanna Johnson
 Steve Bisley as Gordon Farkas
 Marshall Napier as Desmond Clark
 Damon Herriman as Mark Jorgensen
 Angelo D'Angelo as Vangeli Petrakis
 Tim Robertson as Desmond Johnson
 Maggie King as Edith Clark
 Sheryl Munks as Pam Schaeffer
 Lise Rodgers as Mrs. Johnson
 Frankie J. Holden as Frank
 Mark Hennessy as Jimmy
 Roy Edmunds as George

Production
The film was originally known as Mark Clark Van Ark. There were problems raising the money so Tass and Parker mortgaged their house with ANZ Bank, as they did with their first film.

The movie was shot from 6 November to 22 December 1989.

Awards

Soundtrack
Music: Chris Gough and Philip Judd.

The film includes songs by Philip Judd and Tim Finn, the Makers, Schnell Fenster, Boom Crash Opera, Mental As Anything, Bang The Drum, the Breaknecks, Big Storm and the Front Lawn.

Box office
The Big Steal grossed $2,351,628 at the box office in Australia.

Home media
The Big Steal was released on DVD by Umbrella Entertainment in October 2003. The DVD is compatible with all region codes and includes special features such as the original theatrical trailer, Umbrella Entertainment trailers, original cast audition tapes, interviews with Nadia Tass, David Parker, Ben Mendelsohn, Claudia Karvan and Steve Bisley as well as audio commentary by Nadia Tass and David Parker.

Umbrella Entertainment released The Big Steal on Blu-ray in September 2021. The Blu-ray is compatible with all region codes, retains the extra features from the DVD release, and includes a new audio commentary by David Parker, moderated by film buff Paul Harris.

Cars appearing in the film
 1973 Jaguar XJ6
 1963 Nissan Cedric
 1974 HJ Monaro GTS coupe
 1989 Nissan Pintara
 1973 Chevrolet Caprice Classic
 1972 Volvo 144

References

Bibliography
 Murray, Scott (editor), Australian Film, 1978-1994, Oxford, 1995.

External links
 
 The Big Steal at the National Film and Sound Archive
 The Big Steal at Oz Movies

1990 films
1990s teen comedy films
Australian teen comedy films
Films about automobiles
Films directed by Nadia Tass
Films shot in Melbourne
Films set in Melbourne
1990s English-language films